The Gilbertese National Party (GNP) was a political party in the Gilbert and Ellice Islands colony founded in 1965. It was the first ever party in this British colony.

History 
Racial tensions between Gilbertese and Ellice Islanders became more pronounced at the end of 1964. A small group of Gilbertese, most of them senior civil servants, began meeting in private with the view to forming a political party committed to the defense of Gilbertese interests. A public meeting with more than 200 participants attended to the foundation in Bairiki, South Tarawa, on 16 October 1965. The Gilbertese National Party called for faster change and two years later, its leader Reuben Uatioa was first among the 18 elected Gilbertese and 5 Ellice Islander members of the new House of Representatives, amongst them Babera Kirata, the president of GNP.

References 

 Gilbertese National Party. 1965. Gilbertese National Party Constitution. (Source: Barrie MacDonald, The Future of the G & E I, p. 19). Gilbert and Ellice Islands, Tarawa.

Defunct political parties in Kiribati
Political parties established in 1965
1965 establishments in the Gilbert and Ellice Islands